Highland Plains is a rural locality in the Toowoomba Region, Queensland, Australia.

History 
Highland Plains State School opened on 1918. It closed on circa 1945.

Road infrastructure
The Oakey–Cooyar Road runs through from south to west, locally known as Pechey - Maclagan Road from where it turns west. Pechey - Maclagan Road enters from the south-east and joins Oakey–Cooyar Road.

References 

Toowoomba Region
Localities in Queensland